The first series of the 2005 revival of the British science fiction programme Doctor Who began on 26 March 2005 with the episode "Rose". This marked the end of the programme's 16-year absence from episodic television following its cancellation in 1989, and was the first new televised Doctor Who story since the broadcast of the television movie starring Paul McGann in 1996. The finale episode, "The Parting of the Ways", was broadcast on 18 June 2005. The show was revived by longtime Doctor Who fan Russell T Davies, who had been lobbying the BBC since the late 1990s to bring the show back. The first series comprised 13 episodes, eight of which Davies wrote. Davies, Julie Gardner and Mal Young served as executive producers, Phil Collinson as producer.

The show depicts the adventures of a mysterious and eccentric Time Lord known as the Doctor, who travels through time and space in his time machine, the TARDIS, which normally appears from the exterior to be a blue 1950s British police box. With his companions, he explores time and space, faces a variety of foes and saves civilizations, helping people and righting wrongs.

The first series features Christopher Eccleston as the ninth incarnation of the Doctor, his only series in the role, accompanied by Billie Piper, as his first and main companion Rose Tyler, whom he plucks from obscurity on planet Earth, and to whom he grows increasingly attached. He also travels briefly with unruly boy-genius Adam Mitchell, played by Bruno Langley, and with 51st-century con man and former "Time Agent" Captain Jack Harkness, portrayed by John Barrowman. Episodes in the series form a loose story arc, based upon the recurring phrase "Bad Wolf", the significance of which goes unexplained until the two-part series finale. Alongside the "Bad Wolf" arc, the revived era re-introduces the Doctor as the sole survivor of an event known as the Time War, which the Doctor claims wiped out all of the Time Lords and the Daleks.

The series premiere was watched by 10.81 million viewers, and four days after the premiere episode was broadcast, Doctor Who was renewed for a Christmas special as well as a second series. The series was well received by both critics and fans, winning a BAFTA Award for the first time in Doctor Whos history. The approval from Michael Grade, who had previously forced an 18-month hiatus on the show in 1985, and had postponed Doctor Who out of personal dislike on several occasions, was cited as a factor in the show's resurgence. The show's popularity ultimately led to a resurgence in family-orientated Saturday night drama.

Episodes 
Unlike the classic era of the series that ended in 1989, the plan with the new series was to have each episode as a standalone story, with no serials. Of the thirteen episodes in the series, seven of them followed this format; the remaining six were grouped together into three two-part stories. Also, for the first time since The Gunfighters in the third season, each episode was given an individual title, which was the case with the standalone and two-part stories.

Cast

Main cast 
The production team was tasked with finding a suitable actor for the role of the Doctor. Most notably, they approached film stars Hugh Grant and Rowan Atkinson for the role. By the time Mal Young had suggested actor Christopher Eccleston to Davies, Eccleston was one of only three left in the running for the role: the other two candidates are rumoured in the industry to have been Alan Davies and Bill Nighy. His involvement in the programme was announced on 20 March 2004 following months of speculation. In the April 2004 issue of Doctor Who Magazine, Davies announced that Eccleston's Doctor would indeed be the Ninth Doctor, relegating Richard E. Grant's Shalka Doctor to non-official status. Russell T Davies revealed that Eccleston asked for the role in an e-mail.

After the announcement that the show would be returning, Davies revealed that the new companion would "probably" be called Rose Tyler in an edition of Doctor Who Magazine published in November 2003. This name was confirmed in March 2004, and it was announced at the same time that former pop star Billie Piper was being considered for the role. Piper was announced as portraying Rose Tyler on 24 May, a character which fulfilled the role of permanent companion during the series, and was welcomed by fans of the show. Actress Georgia Moffett, daughter of Fifth Doctor actor Peter Davison and who would later appear as the title role in the fourth series episode "The Doctor's Daughter", also auditioned for the role. The original conception of Tyler was slightly different. Paul Abbott was scheduled to write an episode for the series which would have revealed that Rose's entire life had been manipulated by the Doctor in order to mould her into an ideal companion. Davies eventually wrote "Boom Town" to replace it when Abbott, after months of development, realised he was too busy to work on the script.

The first series was Christopher Eccleston's only series in the role of the Doctor. Eccleston's contract was for a single year because at the time it was uncertain whether the show would continue beyond a single revival series. Eccleston's intent to leave was revealed on 30 March 2005, shortly after the broadcast of the first episode. The BBC released a statement, attributed to Eccleston, saying that he had decided to leave because he feared becoming typecast. On 4 April, the BBC revealed that Eccleston's "statement" was falsely attributed and released without his consent. The BBC admitted that they had broken an agreement made in January not to disclose publicly that he only intended to do one season. In a 2010 interview, Eccleston revealed that he left the show because he "didn't enjoy the environment and the culture that [they], the cast and crew, had to work in", but that he was proud of having played the role.

Recurring and guest cast 
The character of Adam Mitchell was first conceived, along with Henry van Statten, during Davies' pitch to the BBC, in a story heavily based on Robert Shearman's audio play Jubilee called "Return of the Daleks". The production team had always intended for Adam to join the TARDIS after Rose developed a liking for him. To play this role, Bruno Langley was chosen, previously known for his role on Coronation Street as Todd Grimshaw. It was never intended for Adam to be a long-term companion, Davies wanted to show that not everyone is suitable to join the TARDIS crew and dubbed him "The Companion That Couldn't", he "always wanted to do a show with someone who was a rubbish companion".

John Barrowman appears as Captain Jack Harkness, a character introduced in "The Empty Child", where he joined the TARDIS crew for the final five episodes of the series. In naming the character, Davies drew inspiration from the Marvel Comics character Agatha Harkness. Jack's appearances were conceived with the intention of forming a character arc in which Jack is transformed from a coward to a hero, and Barrowman consciously minded this in his portrayal of the character. Following on that arc, the character's debut episode would leave his morality as ambiguous, publicity materials asking, "is he a force for good or ill?" Barrowman himself was a key factor in the conception of Captain Jack. Barrowman says that at the time of his initial casting, Davies and co-executive producer, Julie Gardner had explained to him that they "basically wrote the character around [John]". On meeting him, Barrowman tried out the character using his native Scottish accent, his normal American accent, and an English accent; Davies decided it "made it bigger if it was an American accent". Barrowman recounts Davies as having been searching for an actor with a "matinée idol quality", telling him that "the only one in the whole of Britain who could do it was you".

David Tennant had been offered the role of the Doctor when he was watching a pre-transmission copy of Casanova with Davies and Gardner. Tennant initially believed the offer was a joke, but after he realised they were serious, he accepted the role and first appeared in the series finale "The Parting of the Ways". Tennant was announced as Eccleston's replacement on 16 April 2005. Other recurring characters for the series included Camille Coduri as Rose's mother Jackie Tyler, and Noel Clarke as Rose's boyfriend Mickey Smith. Other actors and television presenters who appeared in the series included Mark Benton, Zoë Wanamaker, Simon Callow, Eve Myles, Penelope Wilton, Annette Badland, David Verrey, Matt Baker, Andrew Marr, Corey Johnson, Simon Pegg, Anna Maxwell-Martin, Tamsin Greig, Shaun Dingwall, Florence Hoath, Richard Wilson, Jo Joyner, Davina McCall, Paterson Joseph, Anne Robinson, Trinny Woodall, and Susannah Constantine.

Production

Development 
During the late-90s, Davies, a lifelong Doctor Who fan, lobbied the BBC to revive the show from its hiatus and reached the discussion stages in late 1998 and early 2002. His proposals would update the show to be better suited for a 21st-century audience, including the transition from videotape to film, doubling the length of each episode from twenty-five minutes to fifty, keeping the Doctor primarily on Earth in the style of the Third Doctor UNIT episodes, and removing "excess baggage" such as Gallifrey and the Time Lords. His pitch competed against three others: Dan Freedman's fantasy retelling, Matthew Graham's Gothic-styled pitch, and Mark Gatiss, Clayton Hickman and Gareth Roberts' reboot, which would make the Doctor the audience surrogate character, instead of his companions.

In August 2003, the BBC had resolved the issues regarding production rights that had surfaced as a result of the jointly produced Universal Studios–BBC–Fox 1996 Doctor Who film, leading the Controller of BBC One Lorraine Heggessey and Controller of Drama Commissioning Jane Tranter to approach Gardner and Davies to create a revival of the series to air in a primetime slot on Saturday nights, as part of the BBC's plan to devolve production to its regional bases. By mid-September, they accepted the deal to produce the series alongside Casanova.

Following Scream of the Shalka, an animated episode which was shown on the Doctor Who website, the 'real' return of Doctor Who was announced on 26 September 2003 in a press release from the BBC.

Davies voluntarily wrote a pitch for the series, the first time he had done so; he previously chose to jump straight to writing pilot episodes because he felt that a pitch would "feel like [he's] killing the work". The fifteen-page pitch outlined a Doctor who was "your best friend; someone you want to be with all the time"; the eighteen-year-old Rose Tyler as a "perfect match" for the new Doctor; avoidance of the forty-year back story "except for the good bits"; the retention of the TARDIS, sonic screwdriver, and Daleks; removal of the Time Lords; and also a greater focus on humanity. His pitch was submitted for the first production meeting in December 2003, with a series of thirteen episodes obtained by pressure from BBC Worldwide and a workable budget from Julie Gardner.

By early 2004, the show had settled into a regular production cycle. Davies, Gardner, and BBC Controller of Drama Mal Young took posts as executive producers, although Young vacated the role at the end of the series. Phil Collinson, an old colleague from Granada, took the role of producer. Keith Boak, Euros Lyn, Joe Ahearne, Brian Grant and James Hawes directed the series. Davies' official role as head writer and executive producer, or "showrunner", consisted of laying a skeletal plot for the entire series, holding "tone meetings" to correctly identify the tone of an episode, often being described in one word—for example, the "tone word" for Moffat's "The Empty Child" was "romantic"—and overseeing all aspects of production. During early production the word "Torchwood", an anagram of "Doctor Who", was used as a title ruse for the series while filming its first few episodes and on the daily rushes to ensure they were not intercepted. The word "Torchwood" was later seeded in Doctor Who and became the name of the spin-off series Torchwood.

Davies was interested in making an episode that would serve as a crossover with Star Trek: Enterprise, and involve the TARDIS landing on board the NX-01. The idea was officially discussed, but the plans were abandoned following the cancellation of Enterprise in February 2005.

Writing 

The first series of Doctor Who featured eight scripts by Davies, the remainder being allocated to experienced drama writers and previous writers for the show's ancillary releases: Steven Moffat penned a two-episode story, while Mark Gatiss, Robert Shearman, and Paul Cornell each wrote one script. Davies also approached his friend Paul Abbott and Harry Potter author J. K. Rowling to write for the series, but both declined due to existing commitments. Shortly after securing writers for the show, Davies stated that he had no intention to approach writers for the old series; the only writer he would have wished to work with was Robert Holmes, who died in May 1986, halfway through writing his contribution to The Trial of a Time Lord.

Elwen Rowlands and Helen Raynor served as script editors for the series. They were hired simultaneous, marking the first time Doctor Who had female script editors. Rowlands left after the first series for Life on Mars. Compared to the original series the role of the script editors was significantly diminished, with the head writer taking most of those responsibilities. Unlike the original series they do not have the power to commission scripts. Instead, they act as liaisons between the production staff and the screenwriter, before passing their joint work to the head writer for a "final polish". Raynor said that the job is not a creative one, "you are a part of it, but you aren't driving it."

Under producer Davies, the new series had a faster pace than those of the classic series. Rather than four to six-part serials of 25-minute episodes, most of the Ninth Doctor's stories consisted of individual 45-minute episodes, with only three stories out of ten being two-parters. The thirteen episodes were, however, loosely connected in a series-long story arc which brought their disparate threads together in the series finale. Davies took cues from American fantasy television series such as Buffy the Vampire Slayer and Smallville, most notably Buffys concepts of series-long story arcs and the "Big Bad". Also, like the original series, stories often flowed directly into one another or were linked together in some way. Notably, in common only with the seventh and twenty-sixth seasons of the original series, every story of the season takes place on or near Earth. This fact is directly addressed in the original novel The Monsters Inside, in which Rose and the Doctor joke about the fact that all their adventures to date have taken place on Earth or on neighbouring space stations.

The stories of the series varied quite significantly in tone, with the production team showcasing the various genres inhabited by Doctor Who over the years. Examples include the "pseudo-historical" story "The Unquiet Dead"; the far-future whodunnit of "The End of the World"; Earthbound alien invasion stories in "Rose" and "Aliens of London"/"World War Three"; "base under siege" in "Dalek"; and horror in "The Empty Child". Even the spin-off media were represented, with "Dalek" taking elements from writer Rob Shearman's own audio play Jubilee and the emotional content of Paul Cornell's "Father's Day" drawing on the tone of Cornell's novels in the Virgin New Adventures line. Davies had asked both Shearman and Cornell to write their scripts with those respective styles in mind. The episode "Boom Town" included a reference to the novel The Monsters Inside, becoming the first episode to acknowledge (albeit in a subtle way) spin-off fiction.

Music
Murray Gold composed the music for this series, which was entirely synthesised.

Filming 
Principal photography for the series began on 18 July 2004 on location in Cardiff for "Rose". The series was filmed across South East Wales, mostly in or around Cardiff. Each episode took about two weeks to film. The start of filming created stress among the production team because of unseen circumstances: several scenes from the first block had to be re-shot because the original footage was unusable; the Slitheen prosthetics for "Aliens of London", "World War Three", and "Boom Town" were noticeably different from their computer-generated counterparts; and, most notably, the BBC came to a gridlock with the Terry Nation estate to secure the Daleks for the sixth episode of the series, to be written by Rob Shearman. After the first production block, which Davies described as "hitting a brick wall", the show's production was markedly eased as the crew familiarised themselves. Filming concluded on 23 March 2005. David Tennant, who was cast as Eccleston's replacement, recorded his appearance at the end of "The Parting of the Ways" on 21 April 2005 with a skeleton crew. Production blocks were arranged as follows:

Release

Promotion 
The new logo was revealed on the BBC website on 18 October 2004. The first official trailer was released as part of BBC One's Winter Highlights presentation on 2 December 2004 and subsequently posted on the Internet by the BBC. A media blitz including billboards and posters across the UK started early March 2005. Television trailers started showing up on 5 March and radio advertisements started two weeks before the series premiere and ran till the second episode aired. The official Doctor Who website was launched with exclusive content such as games and new Ninth Doctor information.

Leak 
An early edit of the premiere was leaked onto the Internet three weeks before the scheduled series premiere. This attracted much media attention and discussion amongst fans, and caused interest in the show to skyrocket. The BBC released a statement that the source of the leak appeared to be connected to the Canadian Broadcasting Corporation, which responded by stating that they "are looking into it. That's all I can say at this point because we don't know exactly what happened. It certainly wasn't done intentionally." Asa Bailey, founder of the Viral Advertising Association, said that the BBC hired them for viral marketing strategies, and that he told them "they should release things before their time", to create a "cool factor". Both the BBC and CBC denied any involvement, but Bailey believes that to be disingenuous, saying that it is "the best viral advert they could have done". The leak was ultimately traced to a third-party company in Canada which had a legitimate preview copy. The employee responsible was fired by the company.

Broadcast 
"Rose" finally saw transmission on schedule on 26 March 2005 at 7 pm on BBC One, the first regular episode of Doctor Who since Part Three of Survival on 6 December 1989. To complement the series, BBC Wales also produced Doctor Who Confidential, a 13-part documentary series with each episode broadcast on BBC Three immediately after the end of the weekly instalment on BBC One. Both the series and documentary aired for 13 consecutive weeks, with the finale episode, "The Parting of the Ways", airing on 18 June 2005 along with its documentary counterpart. Davies had requested that the two first episodes be broadcast back-to-back, but the request was given to the BBC just two weeks before transmission, at which point everything was already set. In some regions, the first few minutes of the original BBC broadcast of "Rose" on 26 March were marred by the accidental mixing of a few seconds of sound from Graham Norton hosting Strictly Dance Fever.

In the United States, the Sci Fi Channel originally passed on the new series as it found it lacking and believed it did not fit in its schedule, but the network later changed its mind. After it was announced that the first series would start in March 2006, Sci Fi Channel Executive Vice President Thomas Vitale called Doctor Who "a true sci-fi classic", with creative storytelling and colorful history, and was excited to add it to its line up. The network also took an option on the second series. Candace Carlisle from BBC Worldwide found The Sci Fi Channel the perfect home for Doctor Who. Doctor Who finally debuted in the U.S. on the Sci Fi Channel on 17 March 2006 with the first two episodes airing back-to-back, one year after the Canadian and UK showings. The series concluded its initial U.S. broadcast on 9 June 2006.

Home media

DVD and Blu-ray releases 
The series was first released in volumes; the first volume, containing the first three episodes, was released in Region 2 on 16 May 2005. The second, with "Aliens of London", "World War Three", and "Dalek", followed on 13 June 2005. "The Long Game", "Father's Day", "The Empty Child", and "The Doctor Dances" were released in the third volume on 1 August 2005 and the final three episodes were released in the fourth volume on 5 September 2005.

The entire series was then released in a boxset on 21 November 2005 in Region 2. Aside from the 13 episodes it included commentaries on every episode, a video diary from Davies during the first week of filming, as well as other featurettes. The boxset was released in Region 1 on 4 July 2006.

UMD releases

In print

Reception

Ratings 

"Rose" received average overnight ratings of 9.9 million viewers, peaking at 10.5 million, respectively 43.2% and 44.3% of all viewers at that time. The final figure for the episode, including video recordings watched within a week of transmission, was 10.81 million, making it the third highest for BBC One that week and seventh across all channels. The opening episode was the highest rated episode of the first series. The penultimate episode, "Bad Wolf", received the lowest viewers of the series with just 6.81 million viewers. The series also garnered the highest audience Appreciation Index of any non-soap drama on television. Besides the second episode, "The End of the World", which garnered a 79% rating, the lowest of the series, all episodes received an AI above 80%. The series finale "The Parting of the Ways" was the highest rated episode with an AI of 89%. The success of the launch saw the BBC's Head of Drama Jane Tranter confirming on 30 March that the series would return both for a Christmas Special in December 2005 and a full second series in 2006.

The initial Sci Fi Channel broadcasts of the series attained an average Nielsen Rating of 1.3, representing 1.5 million viewers in total. Although these ratings were less than those reached by Sci Fi's original series Battlestar Galactica, Stargate SG-1 and Stargate Atlantis, they reflect a 44% increase in ratings and a 56% increase in viewership over the same timeslot in the second quarter of 2005, as well as increases of 56% and 57% in two key demographics.

Critical reception 

Review aggregation website Rotten Tomatoes offers an 83% approval from 12 critic reviews, and an average rating of 8.6/10.

In April 2004, Michael Grade returned to the BBC, this time as the Chairman of the Board of Governors, although this position does not involve any commissioning or editorial responsibilities. Although he had previously disliked the show and imposed an eighteen-month hiatus on it during the Sixth Doctor era, he eventually wrote an e-mail to the Director-General of the BBC Mark Thompson in June 2005, after the successful new first series, voicing approval for its popularity. He also declared, "[I] never dreamed I would ever write this. I must be going soft!" The revival also impressed former Doctor Sylvester McCoy, who praised Eccleston and Piper as well as their characters, and the pacing of the first episode. His only criticism was about the new TARDIS interior, though he did comment that he was "also a bit dismayed that more wasn't made of the show's incidental music, which seemed fairly anonymous in the background".

Robin Oliver of The Sydney Morning Herald praised Davies for taking "an adult approach to one of television's most famous characters" that children would appreciate, and that he reinvented it in a way that would be "competitive in a high-tech market". Oliver also wrote that older viewers would find Eccleston "easily the best time lord since Tom Baker". Reviewing the first episode, The Stages Harry Venning hailed it as a "fabulous, imaginative, funny and sometimes frightening reinvention" and particularly praised Rose for being an improvement upon previous female companions who were "fit only to scream or be captured". However, he found Eccleston to be "the show's biggest disappointment" as he looked "uncomfortable playing fantasy". Digital Spy's Dek Hogan found the final episode anticlimactic, but overall said that the series was "excellent Saturday night telly of the kind that many of us thought the BBC had forgotten how to make". He praised Eccleston's performance and named "The Empty Child" and "The Doctor Dances" as the best episodes. Arnold T Blumburg of Now Playing gave the series a grade of A−, praising its variety. However, he was critical of Davies' "annoying tendency to play to the lowest common denominator with toilet humor", but felt that from "Dalek" on the series was more dramatic and sophisticated.

DVD Talk's John Sinnott rated the first series four and a half out of five stars, writing that it "keeps a lot of the charm and excitement of the original (as well as the premise), while making the series easily accessible for new viewers". Sinnott praised the faster pace and the design changes that made it feel "fresh", as well as Eccleston's Doctor. However, he felt that Piper only did a "credible" job as Eccleston eclipsed her, and said that the writing was "uneven" with many of the episodes "just slightly flawed". Looking back on the series in 2011, Stephen Kelly of The Guardian wrote, "Eccleston's Doctor may have had many faults – looking like an EastEnders extra and bellowing "FANTASTIC!" at every opportunity being two of them – but he was merely a reflection of a show that, at the time, still didn't know what it wanted to be. The first series of the revived Doctor Who – which featured farting aliens – was a world away from the intelligent, populist science-fiction we know it as now. But then, it is thanks to Eccleston that it got this far at all – a big, respectable name who laid the foundations for Tennant to swag away with the show."

However, not everyone was pleased with the new production. Some fans criticised the new logo and perceived changes to the TARDIS model. According to various news sources, members of the production team even received hate mail and death threats. "The Unquiet Dead" was criticised by parents, who felt that the episode was "too scary" for their young children; the BBC dismissed the complaints, saying that it had never been intended for the youngest of children.

Awards and nominations

Soundtrack 
On 19 August 2013, the soundtrack was released on 12" Vinyl as a limited edition with only 500 copies.

Murray Gold's arrangement of the main theme featured samples from the 1963 original with further elements added: an orchestral sound of low horns, strings and percussion and part of the Dalek ray-gun and TARDIS materialisation sound effects. Included on the album are two versions of the theme: the 44-second opening version, as arranged by Gold, and a longer arrangement that includes the middle eight, after Gold omitted the "middle eight" from both the opening and closing credits. Gold has said that his interpretation was driven by the title visual sequence he was given to work around. Often erroneously cited as being the same as the end credits version, this second version is in fact a new arrangement and recording.

References

Bibliography

External links 

 
 
 

2005 British television seasons
Series 01
Series 01